Ingerd Erlendsdotter (c. 1440–1526) was a Norwegian noblewoman and landowner during the 15th century.

She was the daughter and ultimate heiress of Erlend Eindridsson (died ca. 1452) and Gudrun Olavsdotter (ca. 1415-1472). Her family estate, Losnegard  (Losnaætten)  was located on  the island of Losna at the mouth of the Sognefjord in Sogn. Through inheritance and marriage, she became one of the larger landowners in Norway. She was commonly known as "Lady Ingerd the Elder" to distinguish her from her relative Inger Ottesdotter Rømer, the landowner of Austrått.

She was married and widowed twice; Olav Guttormsson (died before 1485) and Arald Kane (died ca. 1497). She remained childless after her two marriages. After her death in 1526, the prospect of inheriting her assets affected the political acts of the nobility of Norway, Sweden and Denmark including members of the Rosenkrantz family.

References

External links
Riddarane av Losna Gaute Losnegård, Berit Gjerland and Rolf Losnegård (Selja forlag, 2003)
Losneætten

1440 births
1526 deaths
15th-century Norwegian nobility
16th-century Norwegian nobility
15th-century landowners
16th-century landowners
15th-century women landowners